Connarus monocarpus (Indian zebrawood) is a species of plant in the family Connaraceae. It is native to peninsular Peninsular India and Sri Lanka.

References

External links
Indian flowers

Connaraceae